Bruno da Cruz (born 27 May 1996) is a Brazilian footballer who plays for Evian.

References

1996 births
Living people
Brazilian footballers
Ligue 2 players
Thonon Evian Grand Genève F.C. players
Place of birth missing (living people)
Association football midfielders